The Hong Kong Higher Level Examination was a public examination taken by students in Hong Kong at the end of Form 6 (Lower Sixth), in preparation for entry to the Chinese University of Hong Kong (CUHK) which then offered 4 year courses. It was different from the Hong Kong Advanced Level Examination taken by Form 7 (Upper Sixth) students, and was usually taken by students from Chinese Middle schools. It was abolished in 1993 when the CUHK changed its courses to 3-years, the same as the Hong Kong University, after the introduction of the Joint University Programmes Admissions System in 1992.

History

In 1979, the Chinese University of Hong Kong organized an examination for the high school students who were interested in attending the Chinese University of Hong Kong and it stopped in 1993. After that, the Hong Kong Examinations Authority had organized a new examination known as the Hong Kong Advanced Level Examination.
As simultaneously having both Higher- and Advanced- Level Examinations caused confusion, in 1982 the Hong Kong Education adviser proposed to the Government of Hong Kong to abolish the Higher Level Examination in "Hong Kong education perspective". Education Commission published a second report in 1986 also proposed to repeal the Higher Level Examination.

There were 21,407  students in the Hong Kong Advanced Level Examination in 1980, and only 12,164 students in the Hong Kong Higher Level Examination. However, the Chinese University of Hong Kong launched the "Form Six Provisional Acceptance" system, and the two-year matriculation admitted to CUHK became the other main way for the student. Because of so many disadvantages, the number of attendees to the Hong Kong Higher Level Examination decreased.

In the late 1980s, the Hong Kong Government wanted to create a better university system in Hong Kong. The tenor of studying a degree course in the Chinese University of Hong Kong was then gradually switched from four years to three years. Later on, the Government launched the Joint University Programmes Admissions System (JUPAS). The University Admissions mechanism only acknowledged the achievements of the Hong Kong Advanced Level Examination. Therefore, the Hong Kong Higher Level Examination was discontinued and the last session of the examination was held in 1992.

Exam Subject
Chinese subjects:
Chinese Language and Literature
Chinese history
English subjects:
English
Chinese or English subjects:
Biology
Chemistry
Physics
General Mathematics
Higher Mathematics
Government and Public Affairs to replace Economic and Public Affairs (since 1987)
Economic opening (1980)
Geography
History
Art
Music
Religion (opened in 1981)
Principles of Accounts opened (1982)
Business Studies (opened in 1982)

See also
Hong Kong Advanced Level Examination
Hong Kong Certificate of Education Examination
Education in Hong Kong

References
Hong Kong Examination and Assessment Authority(2007). "Hong Kong Certificate of Education Examination Regulations & Syllabus",Pg5
Hong Kong Education Adviser."Education Bureau (EDB)"",Pg3-5
HongKong(1991)."1992 Hong Kong Higher Level Examination : Rules and Guild"
Statistics Of Hong Kong(1987-1993). "Hong Kong annual digest of statistics"

External links
HKEAA's Explanatory Notes On Examination Results

School examinations in Hong Kong
School qualifications
Standardized tests